The 1989–90 Full Members' Cup, known as the Zenith Data Systems Cup for sponsorship reasons, was the 5th staging of a knock-out competition for English football clubs in the First and Second Division. The winners were Chelsea and the runners-up were Middlesbrough.

The competition began on 7 November 1989 and ended with the final on 25 March 1990 at the Wembley Stadium.

In the first round, there were two sections: North and South. In the following rounds each section gradually eliminates teams in knock-out fashion until each has a winning finalist. At this point, the two winning finalists face each other in the combined final for the honour of the trophy.

Liverpool, Arsenal, Tottenham, Manchester United, Everton, Southampton & Queens Park Rangers opted out of this competition.

First round

Northern Section

Southern Section

Second round

Northern Section

Southern Section

Third round

Northern Section

Southern Section

Area semi-finals

Northern Section

Southern Section

Area finals

Northern Area final

Middlesbrough beat Aston Villa 4–2 on aggregate.

Southern Area final

Chelsea beat Crystal Palace 4–0 on aggregate.

Final

Notes

External links
When Saturday Comes Article on the Full Members' Cup

Full Members' Cup
Full